COMPUTEX Taipei, or Taipei International Information Technology Show, is a computer expo held annually in Taipei, Taiwan. Since the early 2000s, it is one of the largest computer and technology trade shows in the world.

The last COMPUTEX was held from 28 May to 1 June 2019 with sessions about such topics as 5G, facial recognition, and Internet of Things, along with a charity League of Legends tournament.

COMPUTEX 2020 was cancelled after a delay from early June to 28 September due to public health safety concerns of the COVID-19 pandemic.

COMPUTEX is co-organized by government-funded Taiwan External Trade Development Council (TAITRA) and private sector Taipei Computer Association (TCA). The first expo, then called Taipei Computer Show, was held in 1981 and started out as a place where small and medium-sized businesses in Taiwan's nascent computer industry could display their products. Stan Shih, a former head of the TCA, proposed to change to the current name in the fourth expo. As Taiwan's information technology industry took off in the early 1990s and as the Foreign Trade Council Display Hall in Taipei Songshan Airport was put back into use in the eighth and ninth expo, COMPUTEX has since rapidly expanded and become an important showcase for the IT industry globally. On 28 November 2018 (the same day that Deutsche Messe AG announced that there would not be a 2019 CeBIT), it became the largest computer expo in the world, with participation from major manufacturers such as Intel, AMD, NVIDIA, and others, as well as Taiwanese brand names such as Acer and ASUS.

Venues

Beginning
The precedent of COMPUTEX in 1981, was held in the Songshan Airport Exhibition Hall. In 1986, the Taipei World Trade Center (TWTC) Exhibition Hall on Xinyi Road of Taipei City was used for COMPUTEX for the first time and continues to be the major location for the expo since then.  Then following the rise in the demands for more stands and halls, the Taipei International Convention Center, the Taipei World Trade 2nd and 3rd Hall opens successively to meet the demand. After the opening of the International Convention Center opens, major companies such as Intel, Texas Instruments, etc. joined expo.  Then companies such as ASUS, and Acer joined the expo after the opening of the TWTC 2nd Hall.

The Reopening of the Taipei Songshan Airport Exhibition Hall
In 1989, due to the shortcoming of the expo grounds, the Foreign Trade Council Exhibition Hall was put back into use.  Yet there is still a shortage of space, and  several major companies have to resort to using a single stand to display their products, bringing down the expo quality.  The second year, 1990, the sponsors split up the display content into inland sales and foreign sales to solve the falling quality problem. The inland sales part was canceled in 1991, and transformed into the Taipei Computer Application Show in the August of the same year.

Opening of the New Exhibition Hall
After the show return to pure foreign sales route, it triggered a hotel reservation boom. After which, several companies start to search for a better negotiation environment in the neighborhood. Thus setting their eyes on the Grand Hyatt Taipei close by, which offered a good place with a decently low rental fee. And that caused the effect that due to company rental, the Grand Hyatt Taipei always run out of rooms during the expo period.

In 1995, the Taipei International Convention Center officially became part of the expo ground.  This enticed some international companies such as Intel to join the expo. On top of that, due to the floor distribution, some large-scale seminars also transferred their display into the exhibition.  Furthermore, the sponsoring group gathers the companies that have great potentials to display their product in the same floor in order to improve their impressions.  Then, in 2000, after the Taipei World Trade 2nd Exhibition Hall joined the expo, major motherboard-producing companies continued to join the expo.  And in 2002, the sponsors released several stands to semiconductor foundries.

But in 2003, due to the worldwide panic on SARS, the expo was on the fringe of canceling.  Yet, following the agreement of the company, sponsor and medias, the expo was delayed to September, in sync to the completion of the A21 Exhibition Hall (Taipei World Trade 3rd Exhibition Hall).  Along with the work that allows the participating companies to transfer to the new Exhibition Hall, there was the shrink in the crowd from the CeBIT Asia previously.  That which caused the number of people coming to this expo to increase dramatically. And it is from then on, after 2004, the tradition of having all four exhibition halls (1st, 2nd, 3rd Taipei World Trade Exhibition Hall, and the Taipei International Convention Center) to open simultaneously, raising the Computex Taipei to become the 2nd largest computer and technology fairs in the world.

Expo outside of expo continued
Even though after 1995, new exhibition halls opens up and extending the expo display grounds, companies will still consider using the nearby shopping malls and hotels for better negotiation space.  Now, other than the Grand Hyatt Taipei, companies are known to rent the openings around New York New York (NYNY) Shopping Center and Vie Show Cinemas for their activities. This allows the crowds unable to enter the expo to be able to absorb new information about the products been displayed inside the expo.  Sometimes companies even reserved whole cafe and/or fast food restaurants so the buyers are able to take a break in them.

The Opening of the Nangang Exhibition Hall
In 2008, the newly constructed TWTC Nangang Exhibition Hall entered as the latest addition to the ever expanding COMPUTEX venues, which now also include TWTC Exhibition Hall 1 and 3 and the Taipei International Convention Center on Xinyi Road, with more than 100,000 square meters of gross exhibit space.

Transportation
Every year during the expo period, the roads surrounding the exhibition halls always fall into a state of chaos.  The worst part happens around the Taipei City Hall, Keelung Road, and Sinyi Road. When the Taipei Rapid Transit System was still building the Taipei World Trade Center station, it only increased the strain. In which caused several instances that pedestrians crossing the road island, making the local traffic police force very frustrated.

And due to the previous mentioned troubles, the expo have the bad record of it having traffic jams every time there's an expo.  Thus, the taxi shifted area, Taipei City Traffic Department and several local mass transit companies re-designed their service routes and re-adjust their prices to accommodate the growing masses while suggesting the visitors to use more of the public transit system.

Expo shuttle bus
Before the completion of the Taipei Rapid Transit System, the expo shuttle bus only provides rides between the exhibition halls.  Then, following the MRT's completion in 2001, the expo shuttle bus also adds the MRT station close by to their route, allowing the visitors to use the shuttle bus for easier access to the expo.  Free shuttle buses runs between Xinyi Road venues, Nangang Exhibition Hall, major Taipei Metro MRT stations, selected hotels, and Taoyuan International Airport (TPE).

History and figures
 COMPUTEX 2023 is scheduled to be held 30 May–2 June 2023
 COMPUTEX 2022 was held 24–27 May 2022
 COMPUTEX 2021 was held online-only as COMPUTEX 2021 Virtual
 COMPUTEX 2020 was scheduled to be held 28–30 September 2020, after a delay from early June due to the COVID-19 pandemic in Taiwan; but was cancelled.
 COMPUTEX 2019 was held 28 May–1 June 2019.
 COMPUTEX 2018 was held 5–9 June 2018.
 COMPUTEX 2017 was held 30 May–3 June 2017.
 COMPUTEX 2016 was held 31 May–4 June 2016.
 COMPUTEX 2015 was held 2–5 June 2015.
 COMPUTEX 2014 was held 3–7 June 2014.
 COMPUTEX 2013 was held 4–8 June 2013.
 COMPUTEX 2012 was held 5–9 June 2012.
 COMPUTEX 2011 was held 31 May–4 June 2011.
 COMPUTEX 2010 was held 1–5 June 2010.
 COMPUTEX 2009 was held 2–6 June 2009.
 COMPUTEX 2008 was held 3–7 June 2008 and expanded to TWTC Nangang Exhibition Hall.
 COMPUTEX 2007 was held 5–9 June 2007.
 COMPUTEX 2006 was held 6–10 June 2006.
 COMPUTEX 2005 was held 31 May–4 June 2005, adding a new feature "Buyer's Day".
 COMPUTEX 2004 was held 1–5 June 2004. There were 1,347 exhibitors, 118,052 visitors, and a gross exhibit space of 58,730 square meters.
 COMPUTEX 2003 was scheduled to be held in June. Due to SARS outbreak in Asia, however, the show was postponed to September. There were still 1,241 exhibitors and a total of 2,419 booths, and COMPUTEX became the second largest IT trade show in the world in terms of numbers of exhibitors and visitors.
 COMPUTEX 1986 was moved to the newly built TWTC Exhibition Hall on Xinyi Road for the first time.
 In 1984, the expo was officially named COMPUTEX.
 In 1981, the first Taipei Computer Show (the predecessor of Computex) was held in the Songshan Airport Exhibition Hall.

See also

 CeBIT (Hanover, Germany)
 CES (Las Vegas, Nevada, USA)

References

External links

 Official COMPUTEX website – TAITRA
 Computex Online – Taipei Computer Association

Recurring events established in 1981
Computer conferences
Culture in Taipei
Computer-related trade shows
Trade fairs in Taiwan